The R196 road is a regional road in Ireland linking Ballyjamesduff and the N3 in County Cavan.

See also 

 Roads in Ireland
 National primary road
 National secondary road

References 

Regional roads in the Republic of Ireland
Roads in County Monaghan